Eugeniusz Józef Wycisło (born 4 January 1948 in Mikołów) is a Polish politician. He was elected to the Sejm on 25 September 2005, getting 6,836 votes in 30 Rybnik district as a candidate from the Civic Platform list.

He was also a member of Sejm 2001-2005.

See also
Members of Polish Sejm 2005-2007

External links
Eugeniusz Wycisło - parliamentary page - includes declarations of interest, voting record, and transcripts of speeches.

Members of the Polish Sejm 2005–2007
Members of the Polish Sejm 2001–2005
Civic Platform politicians
1948 births
Living people
People from Mikołów